The Yamaha TT-R225 is an entry-level trail bike that Yamaha produced from 1999 to 2004. The TT-R225 was replaced by the TT-R230 in 2005. The street legal version of the same bike is the Yamaha XT225, which has different lights, a smaller rear sprocket, and adds passenger foot pegs and other street legal accessories.  Both bikes are equipped with electric start.  The names TT, TT-R, and XT have been used for off-road and dual-sport versions in different markets and in different eras. The TT-R has chromed steel wheels, steel engine guard, and a lower seat height than the lighter XT with its slimmer body and alloy components.

References

TTR225